List of German corps in World War II

This is a list of German Army corps that existed during World War II.

Army (Heer)

Infantry corps

I–IX
 I Army Corps
 II Army Corps
 III Army Corps
 IV Army Corps
 V Army Corps
 VI Army Corps
 VII Army Corps
 VIII Army Corps
 IX Army Corps

X–XIX
 X Army Corps
 XI Army Corps
 XII Army Corps
 XIII Army Corps
 XIV Army Corps
 XV Army Corps
 XVI Army Corps
 XVII Army Corps
 XVIII Army Corps
 XIX Army Corps

XX–XXIX
 XX Army Corps
 XXI Army Corps
 XXII Army Corps
 XXIII Army Corps
 XXIV Army Corps
 XXV Army Corps
 XXVI Army Corps
 XXVII Army Corps
 XXVIII Army Corps
 XXIX Army Corps

XXX–XXXIX
 XXX Army Corps
 XXXI Army Corps
 XXXII Army Corps
 XXXIII Army Corps
 XXXIV Army Corps
 XXXV Army Corps
 XXXVI Army Corps
 XXXVIII Army Corps
 XXXIX Army Corps

XXXX–XXXXIX
 XXXX Army Corps
 XXXXI Army Corps
 XXXXII Army Corps
 XXXXIII Army Corps
 XXXXIV Army Corps
 XXXXVI Army Corps
 XXXXVII Army Corps
 XXXXVIII Army Corps

L–LIX
 L Army Corps
 LI Army Corps
 LII Army Corps
 LIII Army Corps
 LIV Army Corps
 LV Army Corps
 LVI Army Corps
 LVII Army Corps
 LIX Army Corps

LX–LXIX
 LXII Army Corps
 LXIII Army Corps
 LXIV Army Corps
 LXV Army Corps
 LXVI Army Corps
 LXVII Army Corps
 LXVIII Army Corps
 LXIX Army Corps

LXX–LXXIX
 LXX Army Corps
 LXXI Army Corps
 LXXII Army Corps
 LXXIII Army Corps
 LXXIV Army Corps
 LXXV Army Corps
 LXXVI Army Corps
 LXXVIII Army Corps

LXXX–LXXXIX
 LXXX Army Corps
 LXXXI Army Corps
 LXXXII Army Corps
 LXXXIII Army Corps
 LXXXIV Army Corps
 LXXXV Army Corps
 LXXXVI Army Corps
 LXXXVII Army Corps
 LXXXVIII Army Corps
 LXXXIX Army Corps

LXXXX–CI
 XC Army Corps
 XCI Army Corps
 XCVII Army Corps
 CI Army Corps

Motorised corps
 III Motorised Corps
 XIV Motorised Corps
 XV Motorised Corps
 XVI Motorised Corps
 XIX Motorised Corps
 XXII Motorised Corps
 XXXIX Motorised Corps
 XXXX Motorised Corps
 XXXXI Motorised Corps
 XXXXVI Motorised Corps
 XXXXVII Motorised Corps
 XXXXVIII Motorised Corps
 LVI Motorised Corps
 LVII Motorised Corps

Panzer corps

 III Panzer Corps
 IV Panzer Corps
 VII Panzer Corps
 XIV Panzer Corps
 XIX Panzer Corps
 XXIV Panzer Corps
 XXXVIII Panzer Corps
 XXXIX Panzer Corps
 XL Panzer Corps
 XXXXI Panzer Corps
 XLVI Panzer Corps
 XLVII Panzer Corps
 XXXXVIII Panzer Corps
 LVI Panzer Corps
 LVII Panzer Corps
 LVIII Panzer Corps
 LXXVI Panzer Corps
 Panzer Corps Feldherrnhalle
 Panzer Corps Großdeutschland

Mountain corps
 XV Mountain Corps
 XVIII Mountain Corps
 XIX Mountain Corps
 XXI Mountain Corps
 XXII Mountain Corps
 XXXVI Mountain Corps
 XXXXIX Mountain Corps
 LI Mountain Corps
 Norwegen Mountain Corps

Reserve corps
 LXI Reserve Corps
 LXII Reserve Corps
 LXIV Reserve Corps
 LXVI Reserve Corps
 LXVII Reserve Corps
 LXIX Reserve Corps

Miscellaneous corps
 Afrika Korps
 I Cavalry Corps
 I Military Police Corps
 II Military Police Corps
 III Military Police Corps

Höheres Kommando z.b.V.
 Höheres Kommando z.b.V. XXXI
 Höheres Kommando z.b.V. XXXII
 Höheres Kommando z.b.V. XXXIII
 Höheres Kommando z.b.V. XXXIV
 Höheres Kommando z.b.V. XXXV
 Höheres Kommando z.b.V. XXXVI
 Höheres Kommando z.b.V. XXXVII
 Höheres Kommando z.b.V. XXXXV
 Höheres Kommando z.b.V. LIX
 Höheres Kommando z.b.V. LX
 Höheres Kommando z.b.V. LXV
 Höheres Kommando z.b.V. LXX
 Höheres Kommando z.b.V. LXXI

Waffen-SS (Schutzstaffel)

SS infantry corps
 VI SS Corps
 X SS Corps
 XI SS Corps
 XII SS Corps
 XIII SS Corps
 XIV SS Corps
 XVI SS Corps
 XVIII SS Corps

SS Panzer corps

 I SS Panzer Corps
 II SS Panzer Corps
 III (Germanic) SS Panzer Corps
 IV SS Panzer Corps
 VII SS Panzer Corps

SS miscellaneous corps

 V SS Mountain Corps
 VIII SS Cavalry Corps – planned in 1945 but not formed
 IX SS Mountain Corps
 XV SS Cossack Cavalry Corps
 XVII Waffen Corps of the SS (Hungarian)

Luftwaffe

Fliegerkorps (air corps)

 I Fliegerkorps
 II Fliegerkorps
 III Fliegerkorps
 IV Fliegerkorps
 V Fliegerkorps
 VI Fliegerkorps
 VII Fliegerkorps
 VIII Fliegerkorps
 IX Fliegerkorps
 X Fliegerkorps
 XI Fliegerkorps
 XII Fliegerkorps
 XIII Fliegerkorps
 XIV Fliegerkorps
 Fliegerkorps Tunis

Jagdkorps

 I Jagdkorps
 II Jagdkorps

Flak corps

 I Flak Corps
 II Flak Corps
 III Flak Corps
 IV Flak Corps
 V Flak Corps
 VI Flak Corps

Parachute (Fallschirmjäger) corps

 I Parachute Corps
 II Parachute Corps
 Fallschirm-Panzerkorps Hermann Göring

Field corps

 I Luftwaffe Field Corps
 II Luftwaffe Field Corps
 III Luftwaffe Field Corps
 IV Luftwaffe Field Corps

See also

 List of German divisions in World War II
 List of German brigades in World War II
 List of World War II military units of Germany

German corps, list of
Corps, list of
 
World War II corps
Corps